"Canalla" (English: "Scoundrel") is a song by American singer Romeo Santos with Dominican singer El Chaval De La Bachata. It is the fourth single for Santos' fourth studio album Utopía (2019). The music video was released on June 28, 2019. It was filmed in Dominican Republic. It was directed and produced by Fernando Lugo. The femaled lead was portrayed by Sarodj Bertin.

Charts

Weekly charts

Year-end charts

References 

2019 singles
2019 songs
Bachata songs
Romeo Santos songs
Spanish-language songs
Sony Music Latin singles
Songs written by Romeo Santos
Male vocal duets